Paper Mâché Dream Balloon is the seventh studio album by Australian psychedelic rock band King Gizzard & the Lizard Wizard. It was released on 13 November 2015 on the band's Bandcamp, and then a week later on Heavenly Records. The album was recorded with almost entirely acoustic instruments.

Track listing 
Vinyl releases have tracks 1–6 on Side A, and tracks 7–12 on Side B.

Personnel 
Credits adapted from liner notes.

King Gizzard & the Lizard Wizard
Stu Mackenzie – acoustic guitar, drums, piano, vocals, flute, clarinet, double bass, bass guitar, violin, percussion, sitar
Lucas Skinner – piano, bass guitar
Joey Walker – acoustic guitar, vocals, bass guitar, double bass
Cook Craig – acoustic guitar, vocals (track 9), double bass, percussion
Ambrose Kenny-Smith – vocals, harmonica
Michael Cavanagh – drums, bongo, conga
Eric Moore – "nothing"

Production
Stu Mackenzie – recording (tracks 1–11)
Lucas Skinner – recording (tracks 1–11)
Joey Walker – recording (tracks 1–11)
Jacob Portrait – recording (track 12)
Mikey Young – mixing
Joe Carra – mastering
Jason Galea – artwork, photography

Charts

References

External links
 

2015 albums
ATO Records albums
King Gizzard & the Lizard Wizard albums
Flightless (record label) albums
Folk rock albums by Australian artists
Psychedelic pop albums
Psychedelic folk albums
Dream pop albums by Australian artists